Ooni Lajamisan (Yoruba: Lájàmìsán) was the 8th Ooni of Ife, a paramount traditional ruler of Ile Ife, the ancestral home of the Yorubas. He succeeded Ooni Ayetise and was succeeded by  
Ooni Lajodoogun.

References

Oonis of Ife
Yoruba history